LEZO (укр. ЛЕЗО) – Ukrainian hip-hop band founded in 2005 in Novovolynsk, Ukraine composed of Delta, Girya, Storog and Roks. In 2008 published their album Gostroslovy (укр. Гострослови). Many critics consider it one of the best in Ukrainian hip hop industry.

Discography

Members 
 Delta
 Girya
 Storog
 Roks

Links 
 * Download Gostroslovy

Ukrainian musical groups